The Sparta Prague Open Challenger is a professional tennis tournament played on clay courts. It is currently part of the Association of Tennis Professionals (ATP) Challenger Tour. It has been held in Prague, Czech Republic since 2000 on the TK Sparta Prague, founded in 1905 near Stromovka, inside Prague's Bubeneč district.

Past finals

Men

Singles

Doubles

Women

Singles

Doubles

See also
 I.ČLTK Prague Open
 WTA Prague Open

References

External links
 2000 Draws on ITF website
 ATP Results archive

ATP Challenger Tour
Clay court tennis tournaments
Tennis tournaments in the Czech Republic
Sports competitions in Prague